Manny González may refer to:
 Manny Gonzalez (umpire)
 Manny González (soccer)

See also
 Manuel González (disambiguation)